UAIOE is the fourth studio album by German industrial band KMFDM, released on October 7, 1989 by Cash Beat Records.

Background
Vocalist Raymond Watts had left the group midway through the recording of the previous album, Don't Blow Your Top.

Release
UAIOE was released in 1989 on Cash Beat Records in Germany, on Deutschland Strikeback Records in the United Kingdom, and on Wax Trax! Records in the United States. A remastered reissue of UAIOE was released 12 September 2006, featuring new liner notes and photos of the band.

Reception

UAIOE received somewhat positive reviews. Andy Hinds of AllMusic said the work sounded more complete than previous releases, and called "More & Faster" the band's first classic song. Robert Christgau said the album was "groovier than the noise norm" and said the guest vocalists "add personality".

Track listing

Personnel
En Esch – guitars, vocals, programming
Sascha Konietzko – bass, vocals, guitars, synths, programming, production (1–3, 5–9), mixing (1, 9), remastering
Rudolph Naomi – drums, voice (12)
Morgan Adjei – vocals (1, 3, 4, 8, 9)
Sigrid Meyer – vocals (4, 6)

Production
F.M. Einheit – production (4)
Blank Fontana – engineering
Chris Z – layout
Justin Gammon – layout
Nick Head – mixing (2, 5–8), vocals (12)
Adrian Sherwood – mixing (3, 4)
Brute! – artwork
Fritz Brinckmanniherz – photography
Alice Turzynski – photography
Rick Fisher – remastering

References

External links
 KMFDM DØTKØM UAIOE lyrics at the official KMFDM website

1989 albums
KMFDM albums
Wax Trax! Records albums
Metropolis Records albums